Jean-Baptiste Grivel (29 August 1778 – 10 September 1869), was a rear admiral in the French Navy and naval writer. His son, Baron Louis Antoine Richild Grivel (1827-1882), also rose to the rank of vice admiral. In 1832, he published Considerations navales en reponse a la brochure de Monsiuer de Pradt, one of the earliest writers to attempt to grasp the overall concept of maritime power.

References 

1778 births
1869 deaths
People from Brive-la-Gaillarde
Admirals of France
Knights of the Order of Saint Louis
Grand Croix of the Légion d'honneur
Members of the Chamber of Peers of the July Monarchy
French military personnel of the Napoleonic Wars
French male writers